Keir House is a large country house near Stirling in central Scotland. The estate was home to the Stirling family from the 15th to the 20th century. Keir House is protected as a category A listed building, and the grounds are included on the Inventory of Gardens and Designed Landscapes in Scotland, the national listing of significant gardens.

History
The Keir estate was acquired by the Stirling family in 1448, and a house was built on it in the 16th century. The Stirlings supported the Jacobites during the 18th-century rebellions, and the estate was forfeited. However, they continued to live at Keir, and built the present house in around 1760. Income from those enslaved on the family's estates in Jamaica funded agricultural improvements and landscaping of the grounds.

The gardens were created in the 19th century as a miniature version of the Great Garden of Alloa 20km to the south-east.

Additions were made to the house, including the south-west wing to designs by David Hamilton, completed in 1831. In 1847 Sir William Stirling Maxwell inherited the estate, and began a remodelling of the house and grounds. Architects Alfred Jenoure and William Stirling II worked on the house, while formal gardens were laid out by James Niven. A chapel was added in 1912, designed by Rowand Anderson and Paul, and with interior mosaic decoration by Boris Anrep. Sir William's grandson David Stirling, founder of the Special Air Service, was born at Keir in 1915.

The estate
The estate is entered from the north-east via the New Lodge. Built in 1820 to Greek Revival designs by David Hamilton, this was originally the South Lodge, but was moved to its present location in 1969 when the M9 motorway was built through the eastern edge of the grounds. The Home Farm was built in 1832 and designed by David Bryce, but was elaborated by Sir William Stirling-Maxwell around 1858. The large steading includes a clock tower and a dairy with pictorial tiles.

References

External links
The Stirlings of Keir - Chapter III - The Lofty Brow of Ancient Keir, Clan Stirling online

Country houses in Stirling (council area)
Category A listed buildings in Stirling (council area)
Inventory of Gardens and Designed Landscapes
Lecropt